Tyler Jake Denton (born 6 September 1995) is an English professional footballer who plays as a left-back for  club King's Lynn Town.

A former England U17 international, he can also play as a midfielder. He turned professional at Leeds United in 2014, and joined Port Vale on loan for the first half of the 2017–18 season. He joined Peterborough United on loan for the 2018–19 season and was sold to Stevenage in July 2019. From Stevenage he moved to Chesterfield in October 2020 and King's Lynn Town in January 2021.

Club career

Leeds United
Denton started his career at Leeds United in 2003 and graduated through the academy, turning professional in the summer of 2014, before being appointed as the under-21 captain for the 2015–16 season. Under new manager Garry Monk, Denton was called into Leeds first team squad for their friendlies for the 2016–17 pre-season and was given squad number 33. He made his first team debut on 23 August, when he started at left-back in an EFL Cup fixture against Luton Town; he scored the only goal of the game and was subsequently named in the competition's team of the second round. Three days later he signed a new three-year contract. On 9 January 2017, Denton made his next appearance for Leeds when he started in their 2–1 FA Cup win at Cambridge United. He made his third appearance in the next round of the competition 20 days later, as Leeds were eliminated by non-league side Sutton United. He signed a new three-year contract in August 2017.

Port Vale loan
On 7 August 2017, Denton joined EFL League Two side Port Vale on loan for the 2017–18 season, with a recall clause option in January. The loan was authorized by Leeds manager Thomas Christiansen after he secured Cameron Borthwick-Jackson on a season-long loan. He was a first-team regular under Michael Brown, before losing his place in October under new manager Neil Aspin. He was recalled to Elland Road on 3 January 2018 due to family reasons. Prior to joining Peterborough, Denton was subject of a loan offer from Italian Serie B Side Brescia, owned by previous Leeds owner Massimo Cellino.

Peterborough loan
On 6 July 2018, Denton joined League One side Peterborough United on loan for the 2018–19 season. Manager Steve Evans had briefly been Leeds manager shortly after Denton had turned professional. His debut for the "Posh" came on 14 August, in a 2–0 defeat to EFL Championship side Queens Park Rangers in the EFL Cup. He made his first league appearance on 27 October, in a 2–1 win over Burton Albion. The form of Colin Daniel and Daniel Lafferty meant that he was limited to 14 appearances during the 2018–19 season and chairman Darragh MacAnthony tweeted that "[he] needs to improve massively if to ever break into Leeds team".

Stevenage
Denton joined League Two club Stevenage on 11 July 2019, signing for an undisclosed fee. He missed the start of the season due to injury and was only able to feature in one game before manager Dino Maamria was sacked and replaced by Graham Westley. He played 19 games for "Boro" in the 2019–20 season as the club were relegated after finishing bottom of the English Football League and was released by new manager Alex Revell in June 2020.

Chesterfield
On 10 October 2020, Denton signed with National League side Chesterfield after training with the "Spireties"; manager John Pemberton said he had "been recruited to help the balance of the team [as] we needed a left-sided player to share the workload". However James Rowe replaced Pemberton as manager the following month and Denton did not start a game under Rowe, who also signed left-backs Joel Taylor and Alex Whittle.

King's Lynn Town
On 18 January 2021, Denton signed for fellow National League side King's Lynn Town after his release from Chesterfield. He scored his first goal for the club on 27 February, in a 2–2 draw with Weymouth at The Walks. He played 28 games for the "Linnets" in the second half of the 2020–21 season, though admitted that the team were playing for little more than personal pride after relegation was cancelled due to the leagues below abandoning their seasons. He played 28 games as King's Lynn were relegated at the end of the 2021–22 season and had his contract extended by manager Tommy Widdrington.

International career
In 2011, Denton made his debut for England U17 against the Faroe Islands.

Style of play
Denton is primarily a left-back, but can also play as a midfielder.

Career statistics

References

External links

1995 births
Living people
Footballers from Dewsbury
Black British sportspeople
English footballers
England youth international footballers
Association football fullbacks
Association football midfielders
Leeds United F.C. players
Port Vale F.C. players
Stevenage F.C. players
Chesterfield F.C. players
Peterborough United F.C. players
King's Lynn Town F.C. players
National League (English football) players